Mile Run is a tributary of White Deer Creek in Union County, Pennsylvania, in the United States. It has been described as a "spring run". Wild trout naturally reproduce within the stream and numerous bryophyte species have been observed in its vicinity.

Course

Mile Run begins in a valley between Fawn Ridge and Pine Flat in West Buffalo Township. It flows east-northeast through the valley for several tenths of a mile before receiving an unnamed tributary from the left. It then gradually turns south, receiving another unnamed tributary from the left. At this point, the stream turns south for several tenths of a mile, passing between Pine Flat and Little Mountain. It then reaches the end of its valley and crosses Interstate 80 before turning east-southeast. A short distance further downstream, the stream reaches its confluence with White Deer Creek.

Geography and geology

Mile Run has been described as a "spring run".

Watershed and hydrology
The stream is entirely within the United States Geological Survey quadrangle of Williamsport SE. Its mouth is situated near White Deer.

History
Mile Run was entered into the Geographic Names Information System on August 2, 1979. Its identifier in the Geographic Names Information System is 1181098.

The White Deer Valley Railroad, which was incorporated on December 11, 1900, passed in the vicinity of Lick Run. It was built in 1901 and was owned by John Duncan as a logging railroad. However, it was sold to the White Deer Lumber Company and became the White Deer and Loganton Railroad on April 17, 1906.

Biology

The trout species in the stream is brook trout.

A variety of bryophyte species were observed in the vicinity of Mile Run on July 29, 1995. Approximately 20 species were observed, including  Hygroamblystegium tenax, Hypnum pallescens, Platyhypnidium riparioides, Platylomella lescurii, Hypnum lindbergii, and numerous others.

See also
Lick Run (White Deer Creek), next tributary of White Deer Creek going downstream
Sand Spring Run, next tributary of White Deer Creek going upstream
List of rivers of Pennsylvania

References

Rivers of Union County, Pennsylvania
Tributaries of White Deer Creek
Rivers of Pennsylvania